Gierke or von Gierke could refer to: 

Edgar von Gierke (1877–1945), German physician
Glycogen storage disease type I, also known as von Gierke disease, named for Edgar von Gierke
H. F. Gierke III (1943–2016), American jurist  
Hans Paul Bernhard Gierke (1847–1886), German anatomist 
Solitary tract, sometimes known as the Gierke respiratory bundle, named for Hans Paul Bernhard Gierke
Henning von Gierke, German artist and set designer
Otto von Gierke (1841–1921), German legal scholar and historian
Terry Gierke, American football official

Surnames from given names